Crime in California refers to crime occurring within the U.S. state of California.

State statistics
In 2019, there were 1,096,668 crimes reported in California including 1,679 murders, 14,720 rapes and 915,197 property crimes. In 2019, there were 1,012,441 arrests of adults and 43,181 arrests of juveniles in California.

In 2014, 1,697 people were victims of homicides. 30% of homicides were gang-related, 28% were due to an unspecified argument, 9% were domestic, and 7% were robbery related. The rest were unknown. In 2017 the violent crime rate in California rose 1.5% and was 14th highest of the 50 states.

By location

Los Angeles 

In 2010, Los Angeles reported 293 homicides. The 2010 number corresponds to a rate of 7.6 per 100,000 population. Murders in Los Angeles have decreased since the peak year of 1993, when the homicide rate was 21.1 (per 100,000 population).

Legal procedure 

As one of the fifty states of the United States, California follows common law criminal procedure. The principal source of law for California criminal procedure is the California Penal Code, Part 2, "Of Criminal Procedure."

Every year in California, approximately 150 thousand violent crimes and 1 million property crimes are committed. With a population of about 40 million people, approximately 1.2 million arrests are made every year in California. The California superior courts hear about 270,000 felony cases, 900,000 misdemeanor cases, and 5 million infraction cases every year. There are currently 130,000 people in state prisons and 70,000 people in county jails. Of these, there are 746 people who have been sentenced to death.

Policing 

In 2008, California had 509 state and local law enforcement agencies. Those agencies employed a total of 126,538 staff. Of the total staff, 79,431 were sworn officers (defined as those with general arrest powers).

Police ratio 

In 2008, California had 217 police officers per 100,000 residents.

Capital punishment laws

The death penalty (also known as capital punishment) is applied in California. Governor Gavin Newsom suspended the use of the death penalty in March 2019.

Organized crime
Organized crime in California involves the criminal activities of organized crime groups, street gangs, criminal extremists, and terrorists in California. Traditional organized crime are in the form of Cosa Nostra (LCN), Sicilian Mafia, and Camorra. Eurasian criminal networks specialize in white-collar crime, fraud, prostitution and human trafficking.  Crime cells from Southeast Asia, Latin America, and Eastern Europe impact public safety and the state's economy.

Gangs
Gangs in California are classified into three categories: criminal street gangs, prison gangs, and outlaw motorcycle gangs. Gang operations usually include "assault, auto theft, drive-by shooting, illegal drug and narcotic manufacturing, drug and 
narcotic trafficking, forgery, fraud, home invasion robbery, identity theft, murder, weapons trafficking, witness intimidation, and violence against law enforcement."

Terrorism
Domestic criminal extremists include various racial supremacy groups.  International terrorists include Al-Qaeda, Hamas, Mujahedin-e-Khalq (MEK), and Jamaat ul-Fuqra (JUF).

Notable incidents

 1946: Battle of Alcatraz
 1947: Black Dahlia murder
 1965:
 1965 Highway 101 sniper attack
 Watts riots
 1968–69: Zodiac Killer murders five known victims
 1968: Assassination of Robert F. Kennedy
 1969: Tate–LaBianca murders
 1970: Newhall incident
 1972: United California Bank burglary
 1974:
 1974 Los Angeles International Airport bombing
 Assassination attempts of Gerald Ford in Sacramento and in San Francisco
 1976:
 California State University, Fullerton, massacre
 Cleveland Elementary School shooting (San Diego)
 Gypsy Hill killings
 1977: Kidnapping of Colleen Stan
 1977–78: Hillside Strangler
 1978: Moscone–Milk assassinations
 1981: Wonderland murders
 1984:
 Murder of Kirsten Costas
 San Ysidro McDonald's massacre
 1986 San Francisco fireworks disaster
 1987: Hijacking of Pacific Southwest Airlines Flight 1771
 1988: Dan Montecalvo case
 1989: Cleveland Elementary School shooting (Stockton)
 1991: Killing of Latasha Harlins
 1992:
 1992 Los Angeles riots
 Lindhurst High School shooting
 1993: 101 California Street shooting
 1994: O. J. Simpson murder case
 1996:
 Han twins murder conspiracy
 San Diego State University shooting
 1997: North Hollywood shootout
 1997–98: Rampart scandal
 1999: Los Angeles Jewish Community Center shooting
 2001:
 2001 Isla Vista killings
 2001 Nevada County shootings
 Santana High School shooting
 Stevenson Ranch shootout
 2002:
 2002 Los Angeles International Airport shooting
 Murder of Laci Peterson
 2003: Shooting of Deandre Brunston
 2006: Goleta postal facility shootings
 2009: 
 2009 shootings of Oakland police officers
 Shooting of Oscar Grant
 2010: Death of Lydia Schatz
 2011
 2011 Seal Beach shooting
 Southern California Edison shooting
 2011–12 Los Angeles arson attacks
 2012 Anaheim, California police shooting and protests
 2013:
 2013 Los Angeles International Airport shooting
 2013 shooting of Santa Cruz police officers
 Kidnapping of Hannah Anderson
 Christopher Dorner shootings and manhunt
 2013–14: Interstate 80 rapist
 2014 Isla Vista killings
 2015:
 2015 San Bernardino attack
 Shooting of Kate Steinle
 2016: Orange County Men's Central Jail escape
 2017: 
 2017 North Park Elementary School shooting
 Rancho Tehama shootings
 2019:
 Gilroy Garlic Festival shooting
 Poway synagogue shooting
 2019 Saugus High School shooting
 2021:
 2021 Orange, California office shooting
 2021 San Jose shooting
 2023:
 2023 Monterey Park shooting
 2023 Half Moon Bay shootings

See also 
California locations by crime rate
San Francisco crime family
San Jose crime family
Los Angeles crime family

General:
Crime in the United States
Criminal Procedure in California

References

Further reading
 To Live in Oceanside (San Diego Reader)